Daniel Montes de Oca (born 26 April 1962) is a Uruguayan former professional tennis player.

Born in Colonia, Montes de Oca first appeared on the professional tour in the 1980s when he competed in Grand Prix events, reaching his career high singles ranking of 201 in 1988.

Montes de Oca played a Davis Cup doubles rubber for Uruguay in 1990, against Peru in Montevideo.

In 2002, at the age of 40, he featured in an ATP Tour doubles main draw at the TD Waterhouse Cup in Long Island.

Challenger/Futures titles

Doubles

References

External links
 
 
 

1962 births
Living people
Uruguayan male tennis players
People from Colonia del Sacramento